Abdullah al-Amiri was a judge in the trial of Iraqi former president Saddam Hussein who was replaced after allegations of bias.

External links
BBC News (2006-09-19): Judge replaced in Saddam's trial
Saddam trial judge facing fresh bias allegation
Chief Saddam trial judge pulled from case Al-Amiri caused outcry when he said deposed leader wasn’t a dictator

21st-century Iraqi judges
Living people
Year of birth missing (living people)